Louis Léonce Théophile Perrée (25 March 1871 in Paris – 1 March 1924 in Ivry-la-Bataille) was a French fencer who competed in the late 19th century and early 20th century. He participated in Fencing at the 1900 Summer Olympics in Paris and won the silver medal in the epee. He was defeated by Ramón Fonst in the final.

References

External links

1871 births
1924 deaths
French male épée fencers
Olympic silver medalists for France
Olympic fencers of France
Fencers at the 1900 Summer Olympics
Olympic medalists in fencing
Fencers from Paris
Medalists at the 1900 Summer Olympics